Calostomal is an organic compound that has a carboxylic acid and an aldehyde group. It is an orange solid that is extracted from the mushroom Calostoma cinnabarinum, hence its name. The structure of this compound was confirmed by NMR and mass spectrometry of the methyl ester derivative. This compound is a polyene; its conjugated system accounts for its intense color, similar to lycopene found in tomatoes.

References 

Biological pigments
Conjugated aldehydes
Enoic acids
Polyenes
Aldehydic acids